William Andrews McDonough (Born February 20, 1951) is an American architect, designer, and author. McDonough is the founding principal of William McDonough + Partners, co-founder of McDonough MBDC, and co-author of Cradle to Cradle: Remaking the Way We Make Things and The Upcycle: Beyond Sustainability—Designing for Abundance. McDonough has focused his career on creating a beneficial footprint. He espouses that it is possible to design materials, systems, companies, products, buildings, and communities that continuously improve over time.

Early life
McDonough was born in Tokyo. He was the son of an American Seagram executive. He attended Dartmouth College and Yale University.

Career 
McDonough founded an architectural practice in New York City in 1981. McDonough moved his practice, William McDonough + Partners, to Charlottesville, Virginia in 1994 when he was appointed as the dean of the School of Architecture at the University of Virginia. He served as dean until 1999 and has since served as a professor of business administration and an alumni research professor.  He is chief executive of McDonough Innovation, which provides consulting to global companies, organizations, and governments. He also co-founded the Cradle to Cradle Products Innovation Institute and MBDC, based in Charlottesville, Virginia. 

McDonough was also a senior advisor and Venture Partner at VantagePoint Capital Partners, one of the largest venture capital investors in clean technology. He is also a Senior Fellow of the Design Futures Council. 

McDonough and his architecture and urban design firm, William McDonough + Partners, ground their work in Cradle to Cradle Design, a philosophy developed in the 2002 book, Cradle to Cradle: Remaking the Way We Make Things. The goal is to frame design as "a beneficial, regenerative force—one that seeks to create ecological footprints to delight in, not lament." The primary goal of Cradle to Cradle Design is to shift thinking from doing "less bad" to being "more good". McDonough has also articulated the Cradle to Cradle Design framework as The Five Goods™ (Good Materials, Good Economy, Good Energy, Good Water, Good Lives) to help companies focus and evaluate their efforts on becoming "more good". The Five Goods were also designed to offer a streamlined method of addressing each of the 17 UN Sustainable Development Goals.

The firm's designs are often categorized as green architecture or sustainable architecture. The concept, closely linked with green building, is not known for a distinctive visual style but instead for minimizing the negative environmental impact of a building. McDonough, however, is often quoted as saying he aspires to design something like a tree, something that creates good, like oxygen, rather than minimizing negative impact. McDonough's designs use solar and other passive energy efficiency techniques, as illustrated by the Flow House designed for the Make It Right Foundation New Orleans. The design incorporates deep overhangs, multiple connections with exterior areas allowing for much daylight and natural ventilation, roof-mounted PV panels, water cisterns to harvest rainwater runoff, and rain gardens to absorb any storm runoff.

On May 20, 2010, at Google Corporate Headquarters, the Googleplex, McDonough announced the launch of the Green Products Innovation Institute, which was later renamed the "Cradle to Cradle Products Innovation Institute". The Institute builds on the 2008 California state law establishing the nation's first green chemistry program. The non-profit public/private Institute has received the Cradle to Cradle Certified™ Products Program on an exclusive, worldwide basis to accelerate the transition to safe material use and increased material re-utilization. Executives from Google, Walmart, YouTube, Shaw Inc., and Herman Miller Inc. joined McDonough for the announcement.

William McDonough co-founded the Make It Right Foundation New Orleans with Brad Pitt to rebuild the Lower Ninth Ward in New Orleans.

The Cradle to Cradle Certified™ Products Program is based on five attributes, Material Health, Circular Economy, Renewable Energy, Water Stewardship, and Social Fairness. On June 18, 2019, McDonough delivered a plenary at GreenBiz's inaugural Circularity '19 conference, where he spoke about the program encouraging a safe than circular economy to prevent recirculating harmful chemicals, which he refers to as retox.

At the January 2014 World Economic Forum (WEF) Annual Meeting held in Davos, Switzerland, William McDonough led the first CEO workshop that was centered around sustainable design, with an added focus on Cradle to Cradle, The Upcycle, and the circular economy. Prior to the 2014 meeting, McDonough participated in the organizing process in Geneva, when the WEF partnered with the United Nations to review the issue of climate change.  It was later determined that climate change and the circular economy would be the main focus of the 2014 WEF meeting. McDonough was appointed as Chair of the Forum's Meta-Council on Circular Economy in July 2014.

McDonough addressed the Arctic Circle China Forum in Shanghai and laid out a framework for how to "bring back breathing cities" in May 2019. This system seeks to avoid focusing on releasing less carbon and fewer toxic chemicals into the air and instead shifts to integrating renewable energy such as geothermal as a transformative solution to air pollution and climate change. This vision encourages cities to break out of the urban linear flow of "take, make, waste" and embrace a circular flow of "take, make, retake, remake, restore" to implement a Circular Carbon Economy.

In June 2019, William McDonough delivered a keynote address at Sustainable Brands on "A Bold New Vision for the Collection, Processing, Circularity, and Productivity of Plastic Waste". As a step toward solving the plastics crisis, McDonough directed the audience to "refuse refuse", or reject plastics which are not reusable, recyclable, compostable, and recoverable.

Projects 
McDonough's first major commission was the 1984 Environmental Defense Fund (EDF) Headquarters. The EDF's requirement of good indoor air quality exposed McDonough to the importance of sustainable development.

In 1984, McDonough and his colleagues designed the Environmental Defense Fund office in New York City. Since then, William McDonough + Partners has been responsible for other milestones in the movement, such as 901 Cherry Avenue in San Bruno, California, completed in 1997 for Gap, Inc.; it is now home to Google's YouTube. The building features a  green roof that helps to prevent water runoff, insulates the building from noise and provides a habitat for several species., It received the BusinessWeek/Architectural Record Design Award in 1998. 

Other major corporate projects include buildings for The Gap, Nike, and Herman Miller. These projects led to his commission for a twenty-year, US$2 billion environmental re-engineering of the iconic River Rouge Plant for Ford Motor Company in Dearborn, Michigan. The project included rolling out the world's largest living roof in October 2002.

Dedicated in 2012, the NASA Ames Research Center's Sustainability Base is designed to harvest more energy than it needs to operate and cleanse its water. It was designed to meet a conventional budget and tight timeline, be a test bed for NASA technologies and exceed LEED Platinum metrics. The facility is designed to "learn"—and continuously improve—over time.

Together with his architecture firm, McDonough developed a master plan for the design of Park 20|20, the first large-scale urban development in the Netherlands that adopts the Cradle to Cradle philosophy.

Completed works 
901 Cherry Office Building in San Bruno, California the current headquarters of YouTube
Adam Joseph Lewis Center for Environmental Studies
American University School of International Service
Visitor's Center located at the Bernheim Arboretum and Research Forest in Clermont, Kentucky
BSH Hausgeräte Office, Park 20|20
Ford River Rouge Complex
Fuller Theological Seminary Library
NASA Sustainability Base
Nike European Headquarters
VMware Corporate Campus

Criticism
After being named one of Fast Company magazine's "Masters of Design" in 2004, the same magazine followed up in 2008 with a more critical look at McDonough entitled "Green Guru Gone Wrong."  Interviewing many of McDonough's former colleagues, the author cited his failure to have any meaningful impact with his "cradle to cradle" program, having certified just 160 of his planned 30,000 products, his entirely unsustainable suburban lifestyle, his habit of misrepresenting his professional successes, and that he trademarked the term "cradle to cradle" despite that it was coined by Swiss architect Walter Stahel many years beforehand.

In 2008, McDonough's Huangbaiyu project was also heavily covered for its many design issues, including conflicts between Feng Shui and passive solar design standards, appending garages although no villagers can afford cars, failing to provide space for grazing livestock, and building houses out of potentially unsafe compressed coal dust. In 2008, a PBS Frontline investigation found that McDonough's poor planning and execution of the project had doomed it to failure from the start.

Awards and honors
In 1996, McDonough became the first and only individual recipient of the Presidential Award for Sustainable Development. In 1999, Time called him "Hero for the Planet". In 2004, he received a National Design Award for environmental design from the Smithsonian Cooper-Hewitt National Design Museum.

In May 2008, Vanity Fair magazine offered an extensive profile of McDonough, which included a close look at several of his clients and projects. Similar profiles about McDonough and his work have been published by the San Francisco Chronicle, Discover Magazine,  and Time magazine.

In 2013, Stanford University Libraries began the William McDonough "Living Archive". He was recognized at the 2017 World Economic Forum in Davos, Switzerland, as the recipient of the Fortune Award for Circular Economy Leadership for outstanding contribution to the development of a prosperous and sustainable economy.

McDonough was named as one of Fortune Magazine's World's 50 Greatest Leaders in 2019 at number 24 in recognition of his contributions to the green building movement, being a leading proponent of the circular economy, and his efforts to redesign plastics.

Publications
 Braungart, Michael and McDonough, William (2002). Cradle to Cradle: Remaking the Way We Make Things. North Point Press. 
 Braungart, Michael and McDonough, William (2013). The Upcycle: Beyond Sustainability - Designing for Abundance. North Point Press. 
 William McDonough (November 2016) "Carbon Is Not the Enemy." Nature 539: 349–351.

See also
 Hannover Principles
 Sustainable design
 Ecological modernization

References

External links

 William McDonough (2004) "21st Century Design" (accessed March 26, 2008)]
 Balancing Economy, Equity, and Ecology Through Design - a speech given on October 15, 2008, for Stanford's Entrepreneurship Corner, with both audio & video
 Fast Company: This 'Green Dean' Has a Blueprint for Sustainability
 The Next Industrial Revolution, a Documentary film about William McDonough and Michael Braungart]
 Video of a speech given at GreenBiz 2018 conference
 TED Talks: William McDonough on cradle to cradle design at TED in 2005
 Interview with CNN's John Defterios at World Government Summit 2019
 "Buildings Like Trees, Factories Like Forests", 2003 interview of McMcDonough in the Princeton Independent
 Circular Economy: William McDonough + TriCiclos in Chile (video)
 William McDonough Champions Sustainable Design With the Circular Economy
 

1951 births
American architects
American non-fiction environmental writers
Dartmouth College alumni
Living people
Solar building designers
Sustainability advocates
University of Virginia faculty
Yale School of Architecture alumni
Yale University alumni